Bromopropane may refer to:

 1-Bromopropane (n-propyl bromide), an organobromine compound
 2-Bromopropane (isopropyl bromide), an organobromine compound

Bromoalkanes